Los Olmos is a municipality located in the province of Teruel, Aragon, Spain. According to the 2018 census the municipality has a population of 122 inhabitants.

Los Olmos is located near road N-211 in the Bajo Aragón comarca, south of Alcorisa.

See also
Bajo Aragón
List of municipalities in Teruel

References

Municipalities in the Province of Teruel